Barsotti is an Italian surname. Notable people with the surname include:

Alberto Barsotti (born 1964), Italian athlete
Carlo Barsotti (1850–1927), American businessman
Charles Barsotti (1933–2014), American cartoonist
Dino Barsotti (1903–?), Italian rower
Frank Barsotti (1937–2012), American photographer
Iacopo Barsotti (1921–1987), Italian mathematician
Leandro Barsotti (born 1963), Italian singer-songwriter

Italian-language surnames